Kristina Brounéus (born 25 November 1974) is a Swedish biathlete. She competed in the three events at the 1998 Winter Olympics.

References

External links
 

1974 births
Living people
Biathletes at the 1998 Winter Olympics
Swedish female biathletes
Olympic biathletes of Sweden
Place of birth missing (living people)